Sivaganga  is a city and headquarters of the Sivaganga district in the Indian state of Tamil Nadu. Sivaganga is the Rani Velunachiyar's Kingdom of Tamil Nadu. It is an important city in this district for official and commercial purposes. Its nickname was Sivagangai Seemai.

It is known for the 16th-century Sivagangai Fort, located in City Centre. Inside the fort, the Rajarajeshwari Amman Temple features many ornate sculptures. Nearby, the Government Museum has prehistoric relics and natural history displays. The city is located at a distance of 48 km (30 mi) from Madurai and 449 km (279  mi) from the state capital Chennai.

Sivaganga is administered by a municipality established in 1965. The town is known for agriculture, metal working and weaving. The region around Sivaganga has considerable mineral deposits.

Sivaganga comes under the Sivaganga assembly constituency, which elects a member to the Tamil Nadu Legislative Assembly once every five years. It is a part of the Sivaganga constituency which elects its Member of Parliament (MP) once in five years. Roadways are the major mode of transportation to the town and have rail connectivity.

History
 
During the 17th century, Sivaganga was ruled by the Kingdom of Ramnad, which had its boundary spreading across modern-day Sivaganga, Pudukkottai and Ramnathapuram. The seventh king of the empire, Vijaya Raghunatha Sethupathi (also called Kelvan Sethupathy) ruled from 1674 to 1710 and was succeeded by his sister's son Vijaya Ragunatha Sethupathy. He was succeeded by his son-in-law Sundareswara Ragunatha Sethupathy in 1726. Bavani Sankara Thevan, the illegitimate son of Ragunatha Sethupathy, aligned with the Rajah of Tanjore to attack Ramnad. Though Bavani won, he did not honor the earlier decision to cede some portions of the empire to the King of Tanjore. He quarreled with Sasivarna Periya Oodaya Thevar and sent him out of his province. Both Sasivarna and Kattaya Thevar, the brother of Sundareswara, aligned with the Rajah of Tanjore. Both of them conquered Bavani in 1730 with the help of the army of Tanjore. Kattaya Thevar divided the kingdom into five provinces and gave two to Sasivarna, who became the first king of Sivaganga. As per legend, Sasivarna built the Teppakulam and fort around the spring "Sivaganga", where he met his spiritual guru Sathappan Servai. As per another account, Sasivarna was appointed as the king by the Nawab of Carnatic. Sasivarna died at around 1750 and his son Muthuvaduganatha Periya Udaya Thevar took over the reign. He was shot dead in 1780 by Nawab's troops. His widow Velu Nachiyar and infant Vellacci fled the region and were aided by the two Maruthu brothers namely Periya Maruthu and Chinna Maruthu. Velu Nachiyar ruled the region till 1790, when her daughter succeeded her. The brothers continued the support the new queen, and become de facto ruler of Sivaganga until 1801. The brothers rebelled against the British East India Company and Nawab of Carnatic, who was supporting the company. The brothers were later captured and hanged in Tirupathoor in 1801. The Company appointed Gowry Vallaba Periya Oodaya Thevar as the Zamindar of Sivaganga in 1801.

Sivaganga kingdom was founded by Sasivarna Periya Oodaya Thevar in 1730. The town was subsequently ruled by his successors and ultimately by Velu Nachiyar under the stewardship of Maruthu Pandiyar. They were against the British Empire, but ultimately lost to them in 1790. The Company appointed Gowry Vallaba Periya Oodaya Thevar as the Zamindar of Sivaganga in 1801. After his death in 1829, there was extended legal dispute over the succession. From 1863 to 1877 Kathama Nachiar, a daughter, succeeded in winning the claim, but did not attempt to rule with full autonomy and faced ongoing challenges. Supported in her litigation by George Frederick Fischer, a local cotton merchant, Kathama eventually succeeded in securing an 1863 Privy Council decision which granted her the title. After India's independence in 1947, it was under Ramnad district until 1984 and subsequently a part of the newly formed Sivaganga district.

Geography

Sivaganga has an average elevation of 102 metres (334 feet). The town has a tropical wet and dry climate. The seasonal climate conditions are moderate and the weather is uniformly salubrious. The town gets the majority of its rainfall during the north east monsoon period.

Demographics

According to 2011 census, Sivaganga had a population of 40,403 with a sex-ratio of 990 females for every 1,000 males, much above the national average of 929. A total of 3,880 were under the age of six, constituting 1,985 males and 1,895 females. Scheduled Castes and Scheduled Tribes accounted for 9.59% and 0.07% of the population respectively. The average literacy of the town was 83.86%, compared to the national average of 72.99%. The town had a total of 10,184 households. There were a total of 14,145 workers, comprising 164 cultivators, 294 main agricultural labourers, 246 in house hold industries, 11,406 other workers, 2,035 marginal workers, 54 marginal cultivators, 127 marginal agricultural labourers, 173 marginal workers in household industries and 1,681 other marginal workers. Sivaganga town had a growth of 25% during the decades of 1991 and 2001. The population density of the town has nearly doubled in the decades of 1981, 1991 and 2001. The development was largely concentrated along the whole town area.

As per the religious census of 2011, Sivaganga had 84.75% Hindus, 10.07% Muslims, 4.66% Christians, 0.02% Sikhs, 0.01% Buddhists and 0.49% following other religions.

Administration

Sivaganga is the district headquarters of Sivaganga District. It is bounded by Pudukkottai district on the Northeast, Tiruchirapalli district on the North, Ramanathapuram district on South East, Virudhunagar district on South West and Madurai District on the West. Sivaganga District was carved out from composite Ramnad District during July 1984. The District Courts of Sivaganga is present in the town. These courts are under administrative and judicial control of the Madras High Court (Madurai Bench) of the State.

The municipality of Sivaganga was constituted as a third grade municipality in 1965 and promoted to first grade during May 1998. The functions of the municipality is devolved into six departments: General, Engineering, Revenue, Public Health, Town planning and the Computer Wing. All these departments are under the control of a Municipal Commissioner who is the supreme executive head. The legislative powers are vested in a body of 27 members, one each from the 27 wards. The legislative body is headed by an elected Chairperson assisted by a Deputy Chairperson. The municipality had an income of 54,631,000 and an expenditure of 75,385,000 for the year 2010–11.

Sivaganga comes under the Sivaganga State Assembly Constituency and it elects a member to the Tamil Nadu Legislative Assembly once every five years. The current Member of Legislative Assembly (MLA) of the constituency is Cholan CT. Palanichamy from the AIADMK Party.

Sivaganga is a part of the Sivaganga (Lok Sabha constituency) – it has the following six assembly constituencies – Thirumayam, Tiruppattur, Karaikudi, Alangudi, Manamadurai and Sivaganga.  The current Member of Parliament from the constituency is Karti P. Chidambaram from the Congress party. P. Chidambaram, who was the Finance Minister of the country during the previous tenure, was elected from the constituency for seven times.

Transport

Road

Buses that connect the nearby villages and smaller towns (e.g. Devakottai, Kalayarkoil, Thirupathur, Illayankudi, Thiruvadanai) terminate at the Sivagangai bus-stand. The State Transport Corporation runs long-distance buses to Coimbatore, Chennai from Sivagangai bus-stand. Also main nearest transport hubs are Mattuthavani Bus Terminus & Arappalayam Bus Terminus Madurai, So connecting to Madurai city 24Hrs bus services available from Sivagangai Bus stand. From Sivagangai all mofussil buses that connect towns such as Karaikudi, Manamadurai, Trichy, Sivakasi, Aruppukottai, Dindigul,  Oddanchatram, Palani, Pattukottai, Thanjavur, Theni, Erode, Aranthangi, Nagore, Thiruvarur, Velankanni, Rameshwaram, Ramanathapuram, Kalayar Kovil, Paramakudi, Dharapuram, Pudukottai, Nagapattinam, Tiruppur, Coimbatore (TNSTC), terminate at the bus-stand. And 24 Hrs buses available to reach Madurai (Mattuthavani Integrated Bus Terminus).

National Highway 85 Cochin-Munnar-Bodinayakanur-Theni-Madurai City-Sivagangai-Thondi, NH 36 Villupuram- Panruti-Kumbakonam - Thanjavur-Pudukottai-Tirupathur-Sivagangai-Manamadurai and State Highway SH 34 Ramanathapuram-Ilayankudi-Sivagangai-Melur are the major roads passing via Sivaganga.

Train
. Sivaganga railway station is located in the east side of town, where the railway line of Trichy-Rameshwaram join and this is serving as Guard line for Virudhunagar to Tiruchirapalli Jn for southern districts trains to reach Chennai Egmore and also operating for goods service due to reduce the rush in main line (Virudhunagar, Madurai Jn, Dindigul, Tiruchy). Several Express trains and passenger trains are passing through the town and connecting with the cities like Karaikudi, Rameshwaram, Ramanathapuram, Tiruchirapalli, Coimbatore, Erode, Tiruppur, Chennai Egmore, Thanjavur, Viluppuram, Cuddalore, Pudukottai, Virudhachalam, Varanasi, Bhuvaneswar, etc. So There are direct trains from Madurai connecting the important cities in Tamil Nadu like Chennai, Coimbatore, Kanyakumari, Trichy, Tirunelveli, Karaikudi, Mayiladuthurai, Rameswaram, Thanjavur and Virudhachalam. Madurai has rail connectivity with important cities and towns in India.

Air

Nearest airport is Madurai International Airport 40 km away from the city. There from connectivity available to Major cities like Chennai, Delhi, Mumbai, Hyderabad, Bangalore also with abroad like Dubai, Singapore, and Colombo.

Education

Government Sivagangai Medical College and Hospital is an Educational Institution located in outskirts of Sivagangai Municipality, Tamil Nadu.Also in city having several colleges like Mannar Durai singam Government Arts and Science college, Government girls arts and science college, Vickram Engineering college, Pandian Saraswathi Yadav Engineering College, Micheal Engineering college, Pannai engineering college. Prist University (Madurai Cambus) also located 15 km away from city.

Economy
Graphite is one of the common resources in Sivagangai. Very valuable graphite is available in Sivagangai and its surrounding areas. The Sivaganga graphite is of flaky variety with 14% average Fixed Carbon used in the manufacture of refractory bricks, expanded graphite, crucibles and carbon brushes. TAMIN has over 600 acres of graphite bearing land in Pudupatti, Kumaripatti and Senthiudayanathapuram of Sivaganga taluk, Sivagangai District, Tamil Nadu. Estimated reserve of graphite ore in leasehold area is three million tonnes.(recoverable graphite from 14% F.C is approximately 3 lakh tonnes).

The majority of the workforce is dependent on agriculture (72.8%). The principal crop of Sivaganga district is paddy rice. Most of the district has red soil. The other crops grown are sugarcane, groundnuts, pulses, millet and cereals. Tamil Nadu Agricultural University plans to set up the State's first Red Soil Dryland Research Centre in Sivaganga district.

Sakthi sugar factory is also located in Padamathur, Sivaganga. It has the capacity to produce more than 5000 tons of sugar per day. It provides employment to more than 1000 labourers, directly and indirectly. Moser Baer Clean Energy Limited has commissioned a 5 MW grid connected solar PV project at Sivaganga, Tamil Nadu. The project was awarded to Sapphire Industrial Infrastructure Pvt. Ltd., a wholly owned subsidiary of MBCEL, through a competitive bidding process conducted by the Tamil Nadu Renewable Development Agency. The project is implemented under the 50 MWp generation based incentive scheme of the Ministry of New and Renewable Energy, Government of India.

Tourism

Sakkanthi Big Chettinad style home is famous for cinema shooting and culture. Alangara Annai Cathedral is the major church and headquarters for Roman Catholic Diocese of Sivagangai. (Including Ramnad and Sivagangai District). The church has architecture style like "Fish structure" from the bird eye view. Kannudayal Nayagi Amman temple, in Nataraasan kottai which is 5 km away from the town. Eswar temple in Kalayarkoil is a Hindu temple with pandiyan architecture construction.

Utility services
Electricity supply to Sivaganga is regulated and distributed by the Tamil Nadu Electricity Board (TNEB). The town along with its suburbs forms the Madurai Electricity Distribution Circle. Water supply is provided by the municipality of Sivaganga from Idaikathur Vaigai river (2.5 MLD) and Paiyur Pillai vayal & Keelpathi (0.4 MLD) through feeders located in various parts of the town. In the period 2010–2011, a total of 2.9 million litres of water was supplied every day for households in the town. About 22.5 metric tonnes of solid waste are collected from Sivaganga every day by door-to-door collection and subsequently the source segregation and dumping is carried out by the sanitary department of the municipality. The coverage of solid waste management had an efficiency of 90% as of 2001. There is no underground drainage system in the town and the major sewerage system for disposal of sullage is through septic tanks, open drains and public conveniences. There is a government hospital, a government women and children hospital, and 21 private hospitals and clinics that take care of the health care needs of the citizens. There are a total of 2,013 street lamps in Sivaganga: 333 sodium lamps, 1,662 tube lights, 17 mercury vapour lamps and five high mast beam lamp. The municipality operates two markets, namely a daily market and a weekly market that cater to the needs of the town and the rural areas around it.

Notable people
Palaniappan Chidambaram
Muthulingam (poet)
Kaniyan Pungundranar
Seeman
Ganja Karuppu
Tha. Kiruttinan
Perarasu
Chinnaponnu
Kannadasan
Maranayanar
Velu Nachiyar

See also
Devapattu
Pudukulam
Sivaganga Palace

References

Other sources

 
 

Cities and towns in Sivaganga district
Palayam